The Quebec joint trade union front of 2015 (French: Front commun syndical de 2015) is the name given to the alliance of Quebec trade unions in order to achieve a new collective agreements in 2015 with the Quebec government.

Political history of Quebec
2015 in Canadian politics
2015 protests
2015 in education
2015 in Quebec